Jessica Wright may refer to:

Jessica L. Wright, American politician
Jess Wright (born 1986), English television personality and star of The Only Way Is Essex
J. Madison Wright Morris (1984–2006), American actress